Hayt's Chapel and Schoolhouse consists of a historic church and a historic school building located at Ithaca in Tompkins County, New York. The chapel is a small rectangular frame gable roofed structure constructed in 1847 and measuring approximately 20 feet by 40 feet. The structure features a number of Gothic Revival details. There is a small entrance vestibule added sometime in the 1930s or 1940s when the building was converted for school use.  

In 1996, the Town of Ithaca honored the location with a historic marker. The buildings were listed on the National Register of Historic Places in 2005.

Chapel
Passage of the Fugitive Slave Act of 1850 split members of Ithaca's Presbyterian congregation (located next to DeWitt Park). The church's Rev. Dr. William Wisner was strongly pro-slavery, and a number of anti-slavery church members split with the congregation to establish their own church. This group, headed by prominent abolitionist Charles Hayt, along with Murdock Halsey and others, set up a small gothic church on land donated by Hayt.

Hayt's Chapel was referred to as the "Abolition Church" and was thought to have been a stop on the Underground Railroad, which roughly followed the western shore of Cayuga Lake along route 96. Abolitionist meetings were held in the schoolhouse and chapel.

Schoolhouse
Hayt's Schoolhouse was built prior to the church, in the 1830s and is a one-story frame "T" shaped building in the Greek Revival style. The one-room school remained in use until 1964 and has since been converted to an apartment. The schoolhouse retains features such as its blackboard and flagpole.

References

Properties of religious function on the National Register of Historic Places in New York (state)
Defunct schools in New York (state)
Churches on the Underground Railroad
Churches completed in 1847
19th-century churches in the United States
Churches in Tompkins County, New York
1847 establishments in New York (state)
Buildings and structures in Ithaca, New York
National Register of Historic Places in Tompkins County, New York
Underground Railroad in New York (state)